Mainly between March 16, 1977 and March 30, 1977 (with other attacks occurring in mid-August) a series of massacres on Christian civilians took place in the Chouf region during the Lebanese Civil War. The massacres were mostly committed by Druze gunmen of the People's Liberation Army after the assassination of Druze leader Kamal Jumblatt. Many victims were mutilated and women were reportedly sexually abused.

Background 
Long-standing enemies since the 1860s, the Druze have always been at odds with the Maronites, and acts of barbarism on both sides have bedevilled their ability to co-exist for centuries past. On 16 March 1977, the PSP leader Kamal Jumblatt was ambushed and killed in his car near Baakline in the Chouf by unidentified gunmen (allegedly, fighters from the pro-Syrian faction of the Syrian Social Nationalist Party, acting in collusion with the Syrian military commander of the Mount Lebanon region, Colonel Ibrahim Houeijy); believing that the perpetrators were members of the predominately Christian Phalangist Kataeb Regulatory Forces (KRF) or Tigers Militias, PLF militiamen extracted swift retribution on the local Maronite population living in the intermixed towns and villages around Baakline. Despite the hasty dispatch on 17 March of 4,000 Syrian Army troops from the Arab Deterrent Force (ADF) to keep the peace in the Chouf, it is estimated that about 177–250 Maronite villagers were killed in reprisal actions at the towns of Moukhtara and Barouk, and at the villages of Mazraat el-Chouf, Maaser el-Chouf, Botmeh, Kfar Nabrakh, Machghara and Brih (St George's Church attack).

Attacks

Mazraat el-Chouf 
On March 17, Druze militiamen committed killing sprees in Mazraat el-Chouf killing 52 people in the village.

Maaser el-Chouf 
In Maaser el-Chouf, 9 people were killed during a funeral and 3 others who were fleeing along with 9 people from a neighboring village called Machghara. As a result 25,000 Christians fled the area, mostly moving to East Beirut.

Brih 
On August 21, Druze leftist gunmen attacked St George's Church during prayers on Sunday with automatic gunfire inside and around the church killing 13 people. The Christian population fled the village. However, current construction projects have taken place to repair abandoned Christian houses with the aim of repopulating the Christian households of Brih.

Other attacks 
Other killings took place in Barouk (28 killed), Botmeh (9 killed), Kfarnabrakh (6 killed), Fraydis (6 killed), as well as in Baadaran, Shurit, and Ain-Zhalta. Many victims were reported to have been mutilated and women sexually abused.

Aftermath 
Between 1975 to 1977, after numerous successive attacks terrorizing the population, around 260,000 Christians (60% of the Christian population in the Chouf) fled their villages mostly moving to Beirut and its surrounding suburbs.

References 

1977 in Lebanon
Massacres of the Lebanese Civil War
Massacres in Lebanon
Chouf District
Massacres of Christians in Lebanon
Massacres in 1977
1977 murders in Lebanon